= The Last Western =

First edition

The Last Western is an American novel by Thomas S. Klise, published by Argus Communications in 1974. The book was also published on June 28, 1974, by Tabor Publishing. Oddly, the Tabor Publishing resembles a mimeograph of the original printing.

The story follows multiracial teen protagonist Willie, a budding baseball prodigy, from his obscure beginnings in the American Southwest to religious leader and international humanitarian. After gaining local fame as a baseball pitcher on the field, Willie enjoys a meteoric rise to celebrity status.

The Journal of Sports and Social Issues featured the book in its March 1979 issue, in an article entitled "A Step Over the Edge: the Image of Sport in Thomas Klise's the Last Western." The Los Angeles Times reviewed the novel in 1980 under the title "A quality book discovered."
